Rejoice Broadcast Network, branded as "Rejoice Radio", is a network of Christian radio stations airing a format of Christian talk and teaching and Christian music. The network is owned by Pensacola Christian College.

History
Since 1971, Rejoice Radio has broadcast Christian music and programs to encourage listeners and witness in the community. In the early 1970s, Dr. Arlin Horton was inspired to start a Christian radio station for listeners along the upper Gulf Coast. On June 21, 1971, WPCS began operation. In December 1996, WPCS expanded its outreach by broadcasting the Rejoice Broadcasting Network on its first scintillator station in Eugene, Oregon.
Now through the financial support of its listeners, Rejoice Radio is broadcast on almost 40 and 2 affiliates stations and the Internet, reaching listeners across America and around the world. Rejoice Radio continues the vision of broadcasting Christian music and programming to encourage believers and provide a gospel witness in the community.

Timeline
1971
On June 21, WPCS signed on the air as an educational, noncommercial, nonprofit, Christian radio ministry for the northwest Florida area. From its frequency 89.3 FM, WPCS broadcast Christian programming 17 hours a day.
1985
WPCS began broadcasting 24 hours a day.
1987
WPCS moved to a new tower, and the frequency changed to 89.5 FM.
1988
WPCS moved to its current location in the Visual and Performing Arts building of Pensacola Christian College.
1996
In December, the Rejoice Broadcast Network began with its first station in Eugene, Oregon.
1997
RBN became available on the Internet, extending its ministry to listeners around the globe.
In March, the translator of Toledo, Oregon 88.7 FM began broadcasting.
In June, the translator of Vero Beach, Florida 88.5 FM began broadcasting.
In October, the translator of Klamath Falls, Oregon 89.9 FM began broadcasting.
In December, the translator of Kalamazoo, Michigan 91.7 FM began broadcasting and Muskegon, Michigan 90.7 FM began broadcasting.
1998
In January, the translator of Rockford, Illinois 91.9 FM began broadcasting, Las Cruces, New Mexico 91.9 FM began broadcasting, and Talent, Oregon 89.7 FM began broadcasting.
In April, the translator of Grand Junction, Colorado 91.7 FM began broadcasting and Hattiesburg, Mississippi 91.1 FM began broadcasting.
In May, the translator of Kankakee, Illinois 89.3 FM began broadcasting.
In July, the translator of Terre Haute, Indiana 91.3 FM began broadcasting.
In August, the translator of Salisbury, Maryland 89.9 FM began broadcasting.
In September, the translator of Manhattan, Kansas 90.7 FM began broadcasting.
In October, the translator of Fort Wayne, Indiana 89.7 FM began broadcasting, Wabash, Indiana 88.5 FM began broadcasting, Benton Harbor, Michigan 90.3 FM began broadcasting, and Wausau, Wisconsin 90.3 FM began broadcasting.
In November, the translator of Warsaw, Indiana 91.3 FM began broadcasting, Mansfield, Pennsylvania 89.1 FM began broadcasting, and Casper, Wyoming 89.7 FN began broadcasting.
In December, the translator of Great Falls, Montana 90.3 FM began broadcasting and Kalispell, Montana 90.5 FM began broadcasting.
1999
In April, the translator of Grand Island, Nebraska 89.7 FM began broadcasting.
In June, the translator of Wheeling, West Virginia 89.7 FM began broadcasting.
In August, the translator of West Schuyler, New York 88.5 FM began broadcasting. In October, the translator of Lafayette, Indiana 92.7 FM began broadcasting.
2000
In March, the translator of Rome, Georgia 90.9 FM began broadcasting.
2002
In January, the translator of Johnson City, Tennessee 89.1 FM began broadcasting.
In April, the translator of Elmira, New York 88.9 FM began broadcasting.
In June, the translator of Sioux City, Iowa 91.9 FM began broadcasting. In November, the translator of Williamsport, Indiana 91.1 FM began broadcasting.
2003
In March, the translator of Meridian, Mississippi 89.7 FM began broadcasting.
In July, the translator of Twin Falls, Idaho 89.3 FM began broadcasting.
In October, the translator of Woodrow, Texas 91.5 FM began broadcasting.
2004
In January, the translator of Huntsville, Texas 91.1 FM began broadcasting.
2010
On April 23, the full-power station KPCS 89.7 FM began broadcasting in the Minneapolis/St. Paul, Minnesota area.
2015
Rejoice Radio became available on mobile devices.
2017
On February 10, the full-power station KRRB 88.1 FM began broadcasting in the Boise, Idaho area.
2018
In October, the low-power station WJQY-LP 101.1 FM began broadcasting in the Wilson, North Carolina area.
2019
In August, the affiliates station WKZD 1310 AM and 104.9 FM began broadcasting in the Priceville, Alabama area.

Stations
Rejoice Radio is heard on 40 stations and 2 affiliates. The network's flagship station is WPCS in Pensacola, Florida.

Notes:

References

External links
Rejoice Broadcast Network's official website

Christian radio stations in the United States
American radio networks